The National Black Caucus of State Legislators (NBCSL) is an American political organization composed of African Americans elected to state legislatures in the United States and its territories.

Background
NBCSL was founded in 1977 after a group of about eighteen African American state legislators, attending the annual meeting of the National Conference of State Legislatures and perceiving that the NCSL was still "racially exclusive" at that time, decided to call for a national conference in Nashville, Tennessee.  About ninety African American state legislators attended.  The first president was Michigan state representative Matthew McNeely. The organization has grown to more than six hundred members by 2008.  Legislators of this organization come from 44 states, the U.S. Virgin Islands, and the District of Columbia.

Since its inception, NBCSL has met annually in a pre-determined host state for its Annual Legislative Conference.  Throughout the year, NBCSL sponsors policy symposia to keep members abreast of growing policy trends and educated on policy issues that affect NBCSL’s constituents.  When legislators attend the Annual Legislative Conference, policy committees meet and discuss policy resolutions, drawing upon information presented in the symposia, that are voted up or down by the membership.  These resolutions become the policy position of the organization.  Legislators, corporate partners, and labor representatives take these policy resolutions and use them to influence public policy in state legislatures and on Capitol Hill.

Mission
The National Black Caucus of State Legislators (NBCSL) is a membership association representing more than 700 black state legislators from 47 states, the District of Columbia and the Virgin Islands. NBCSL members represent more than 50 million Americans of various racial backgrounds. NBCSL monitors federal and state activity and provides this information to its members through policy symposiums and conferences. Each year, NBCSL members pass policy resolutions that directly impact federal and state policy. The organization focuses on issues that directly impact US domestic policy and is committed to policies that positively affect all Americans.

The primary mission of the NBCSL is to develop, conduct, and promote educational, research, and training programs designed to enhance the effectiveness of its members, as they consider legislation and issues of public policy which impact, either directly or indirectly, upon the general welfare of African American constituents within their respective jurisdictions.

Executive officers
Representative Billy Mitchell (GA), President

Representative Laura V. Hall (AL), President-Elect

Representative Harold M. Love Jr. (TN), Vice President

Representative Vivian Flowers (AR), Secretary

Senator Raumesh Akbari (TN), Financial Secretary

Representative Cherish Pryor (IN), Treasurer

Senator Gerald Neal (KY), Parliamen

Senator Pat Spearman (NV), Chaplain

State legislative black caucuses

References

External links
 

 
 
Organizations established in 1977